The Philippines has participated in the Special Olympics World Games several times. The team won nine gold medals in the 2007 games, the most it ever had at that time. They have since surpassed that total during the 2015 games, when the team won a total of 64 medals, including 24 gold.

Medals

Best performances in bold.

References

Special Olympics
Philippines at multi-sport events